Postmodern television is related to the art and philosophy of postmodernism.

List of postmodernist shows
The Rehearsal
Inventing Anna
WandaVision
Neon Genesis Evangelion
Miami Vice
Community
Fleabag
The X-Files
BoJack Horseman
Bob's Burgers
Space Ghost: Coast to Coast
Archer
Family Guy
Ed, Edd and Eddy
Breaking Bad
The Office
How I Met Your Mother
RuPaul's Drag Race
Mystery Science Theater 3000
Seinfeld
Curb Your Enthusiasm
The Twilight Zone
The Prisoner
Arrested Development
It's Always Sunny in Philadelphia
The Simpsons
South Park
Stranger Things
Rick and Morty
The Singing Detective
Twin Peaks
Monty Python's Flying Circus
The Colbert Report
Futurama
Scrubs
30 Rock<ref>[https://books.google.com/books?id=Oe4fDAAAQBAJ&dq=30+rock+postmodern&pg=PT235 TV Finales FAQ - Google Books]</ref>
The Sopranos
The Larry Sanders Show
True Detective
The Bullwinkle Show
Catfish
The Ren & Stimpy Show

See also
Postmodernist film
Golden Age of Television (2000s-present)
Reality television
Pop culture fiction
Quality television

References

1960s in television
1980s in television
1990s in television
2000s in television
2010s in television
2020s in television
1960s in animation
1990s in animation
2010s in animation
 
Postmodern art
Self-reflexive television
Postmodernism